Qëndrim Rijani is an Albanian director of theatre, film and opera. He has directed many plays, Albanian and foreign, that were performed in many different countries in Europe and that have been honored with many awards in various festivals. His plays are characterised by his direct and rough style. He is the director of the first Albanian opera in North Macedonia.

Early life
Qëndrim Rijani was born on 30 March 1990 in Kichevo, North Macedonia. He attended elementary and high school in his hometown. He got a theatre director degree in the Arts University of Tirana. In this same university, he got his master's degree in Spectacle and Theatre Directing with his thesis called: "Kiçi dhe kthetrat e tij". He also has taken part in some specialty workshops in his field.

Career
He brought his first play on stage independently (without an artistic supervisor) in the third year of his university studies. He has directed many successful plays, Albanian and foreign, that were produced in Albania, North Macedonia and Kosovo, plays which also have been performed in theatrical festivals in many European countries including Bosnia and Herzegovina, Serbia, Russia, Switzerland and Turkey. His career took off around 2014–2015 with the plays “Doktor Shuster” and “Gjymtimi”, which were very successful and won a considerable amount of awards considering the young age of the director and gave a boost to his artistic life. In 2018, Qëndrim Rijani was selected to be part of the jury in the Nationwide Theatrical Festival in Tirana. In 2019, Qëndrim Rijani brought to his audience the play “Xhelatët” and opera “Skënderbeu”. Two works of in higher cultural category, each having required two years of work to prepare. His now the in-house director in the Albanian Theater in Skopje, outer professor in the Arts University in Tirana where he teaches Acting Mastery and outer professor  in the State University of Tetova where he teaches Theatre Directing.

To this day, he has directed 16 plays in professional national and city theatres:

 “Ne vijmë për Ajër” (Catastrophic Love Puzzles in Outer Space) - Scotto Moore
 “Kapitulli i Dytë” (Chapter Two) - Neil Simon
 “Gjymtimi” (A Behanding in Spokane) - Martin McDonagh
 “Doktor Shuster” (Doktor Šuster / Doctor Shoemaker) - Dušan Kovačević
 “Art” - Yasmina Reza
 “Gënjeshtër Pas Gënjeshtre” (The Big Lie) - Anthony Neilson
 “Ushtria e Ui Tomasit” (The Lieutenant of Inishmore) - Martin McDonagh
 “Shtëpia e Bernarda Albës” (La casa de Bernarda Alba / The House of Bernarda Alba) - Federico Garcia Lorca
 “Darka e Thërrimeve” - Refet Abazi
 “39 Hapat” (The 39 Steps) - Alfred Hitchcock
 “Gratë” (Huit femmes / Eight Women) - Robert Thomas
 “Roberto Xuko” (Roberto Zucco) - Bernard-Marie Koltès
 “Në Det” (Na pełnym morzu / At Sea) - Sławomir Mrożek
 "Jashtë Bie Borë" (...e fuori nevica! / And It's Snowing Outside) - Vincenzo Salemme
 "Xhelatët (Hangmen)" - Martin McDonagh
 "Opera për tre grosh" (The Threepenny Opera) - Bertolt Brecht
 "Plus 18" - David Mamet & Arian Krasniqi
 "11 Të Xhindosur" (Twelve Angry Men) - Reginald Rose
 "Fishkëllimë në Errësirë" (A Whistle in the Dark) - Tom Murphy

Besides these plays, he has also directed a documentary titled "Kokën Mbrapa" and an opera named “Skënderbeu”.

Opera 
The opera “Skënderbeu” is one of the most important works of Qëndrim Rijani as a director, on which he worked with the composer Fatos Lumani and the librettist Arian Krasniqi. The first announcement for work being underway on this opera first came from an interview at Ora News, nine months before the premiere. This opera is the first Albanian opera in North Macedonia. This historical opera premiered at the national theater of the Macedonian Opera and Ballet on 23 December 2019. It was very well receive by the public receiving a standing ovation that lasted nine full minutes.

Style 
What characterizes Qëndrim Rijanin is his rough style that he conveys in plays through the characters. These characters, by way of their emotional burden and their direct nature, come out via dark humour with a coarseness differentiating them from the portraits of traditional theater. This style is also reflected in his favourite playwright: Martin McDonagh, three plays of whom he has put on stage and he has also participated in a theater festival dedicated to this playwright in Perm, Russia.

Awards

Personal Awards 
Besides the awards won by plays in festival, Qëndrim Rijani has also received these yearly awards for his work as a theatrical director:

References

Academic staff of the University of Arts, Tirana
Living people
Albanian theatre directors
Albanian film directors
1990 births
Academic staff of the State University of Tetova